The SEABA Under-18 Championship for Women is an under-18 basketball championship in the International Basketball Federation's Southeast Asia Basketball Association, one of FIBA Asia's subzone. The event will commence in 2014 and will be held bi-annually. The winners represent SEABA in the FIBA Asia Under-18 Championship for Women.

Summary

Medal table

References

 
Under-18 basketball competitions between national teams
Women's basketball competitions in Asia between national teams
2014 establishments in Asia